Carriere is an unincorporated community in Pearl River County, Mississippi, United States. The zip code is 39426.

References

Unincorporated communities in Pearl River County, Mississippi
Unincorporated communities in Mississippi